Adam Larry Timmerman (born August 14, 1971) is a former American football guard in the National Football League, and Super Bowl champion for the St. Louis Rams and Green Bay Packers.

He played for the Green Bay Packers and St. Louis Rams between 1995 and 2006. A Second-team All-Pro selection in 2001, Timmerman went to four Super Bowls in his career, winning Super Bowl XXXI with the Packers and Super Bowl XXXIV with the Rams.

Youth and high school
Timmerman was born in Cherokee, Iowa. He attended Washington High School in Cherokee, Iowa, and starred in football, basketball, and track. In football, he won All-Conference honors, and was an All-State Honorable Mention honoree. In track, he finished eighth in the state track meet on the 110 high hurdles as a senior. Timmerman graduated from Washington High School in Cherokee, Iowa, in 1989.

College career
Timmerman attended South Dakota State University for agribusiness and played college football at South Dakota State. While there, he won two Division II All-America honors, was a two-time First-team Academic All-Conference pick, and as a senior, won the "Jim Langer Award", which is given to the nation's top Division II lineman.

Professional career

Green Bay Packers
Timmermann was drafted by the Green Bay Packers in the 7th round (230th overall) of the 1995 NFL Draft.  He played his first four seasons with the Green Bay Packers, making it to two Super Bowls and winning Super Bowl XXXI. Timmerman started every game for the Packers in the 1996–1998 seasons.

St. Louis Rams

In 1999, Timmerman joined the Rams and won another Super Bowl ring in Super Bowl XXXIV. He also made it back to the Super Bowl with the Rams in Super Bowl XXXVI, losing to the New England Patriots. the St. Louis Rams. The Rams released Timmerman on February 27, 2007, and he officially retired following the 2006 season.

Life after football
Timmerman returned to his agricultural farming back in Cherokee and became the general manager for ICON Ag and Turf (a John Deere dealer).

References

External links
 NFL Enterprises LLC: Adam Timmerman
 Pro-Football=Reference.Com: Adam Timmerman

1971 births
Living people
American football offensive guards
Green Bay Packers players
National Conference Pro Bowl players
People from Cherokee, Iowa
South Dakota State Jackrabbits football players
St. Louis Rams players